Odozana cocciniceps is a moth of the subfamily Arctiinae. It was described by E. Dukinfield Jones in 1908. It is found in Panama.

References

Lithosiini
Moths described in 1908